Please is a usually polite expression of request.

Please may also refer to:

Music

Albums 

Please (Pet Shop Boys album) (1986)
Please (Matt Nathanson album) (1993)

Songs 

"Please" (Toni Braxton song) (2005)
"Please" (Robin Gibb song) (2003)
"Please (You Got That ...)", a 1993 song by INXS
"Please" (The Kinleys song) (1997)
"Please" (Shizuka Kudo song) (1991)
"Please" (Pam Tillis song) (2000)
"Please" (U2 song) (1997)
"Please", a 1998 song by The Apples in Stereo from Velocity of Sound
"Please", a 1970 song by John Cale from Vintage Violence
"Please", a 1932 song by Bing Crosby
"Please", a 2015 song by Sawyer Fredericks
"Please", a 2007 song by Paul Hartnoll from The Ideal Condition
"Please", a 2002 song by Chris Isaak from Speak of the Devil
"Please", a 2003 song by Lamb from Between Darkness and Wonder
"Please", a 2021 song by Lil Baby and Lil Durk from The Voice of the Heroes
"Please", a 2003 song by Maxeen from Maxeen
"Please", a 2010 song by Tom McRae from The Alphabet of Hurricanes
"Please", a 1999 song by Nine Inch Nails from The Fragile
"Please", a 2005 song by Staind from Chapter V
"Please", a 2001 song by Pam Tillis from Thunder & Roses
"Please", a 1989 song from the musical Miss Saigon

Other uses 
Please (film), a 1933 short musical comedy film
PLEASE, a keyword in the INTERCAL programming language

See also 
 Gratification
 "Please, Please", a song by McFly 
 Please, Please, Please (disambiguation)
 Plea (disambiguation)
 Pleasure